Saphenista orescia is a species of moth of the family Tortricidae. It is found in the Federal District of Mexico.

References

Moths described in 1986
Saphenista